Bernadett Temes (born 15 May 1986 in Győr) is a Hungarian handballer playing for Alba Fehérvár KC and the Hungarian national team as a playmaker.

She made her international debut on 28 February 2007 against Norway.

Achievements
Nemzeti Bajnokság I:
Winner: 2005, 2006
Silver Medallist: 2004, 2007
Bronze Medallist: 2003, 2010
Magyar Kupa:
Bronze Medallist: 2008
Women's EHF Cup Winners' Cup:
Winner: 2013
Women's EHF Cup:
Finalist: 2016
World University Championship:
Winner: 2010

References

External links
 Bernadett Temes Official Website
 Bernadett Temes career statistics at Worldhandball

1986 births
Living people
Hungarian female handball players
Sportspeople from Győr
Expatriate handball players
Hungarian expatriate sportspeople in Austria
Győri Audi ETO KC players